This is an incomplete list of rivers that are at least partially in Malaysia. The rivers are grouped by strait or sea. The rivers flowing into the sea are sorted along the coast. Rivers flowing into other rivers are listed by the rivers they flow into. The rivers that have their mouths in Malaysia are given in italics. The same river may be found in more than one state as many rivers cross state borders.

Rivers by international borders

Rivers by state borders

Rivers flowing into the Celebes Sea

Sabah

 Kalabakan River
 Kalumpang River
 Serudong River
 Silabukan River
 Tawau River
 Tingkayu River

Rivers flowing into the South China Sea

Johor

 Pulai River (22 km)
 Johor River (122.7 km)
 Endau River (280 km)
 Sembrong River (110 km)
 Jemaluang River (40 km)
 Mersing River (60 km)

Kelantan

 Golok River (110 km)
 Kelantan River (248 km)
 Nenggeri River (52 km)
 Galas River (87 km)
 Lebir River (87 km)
 Kemasin River
 Semerak River
 Raja Gali River
 Pengkalan Datu River
 Mak Neralang River
 Bachok River
 Pengkalan Chepa River (10 km)
 Melawi River, Bachok
 Sungai Dua River, Bachok 
 Tapang River

Pahang

Jerantut River (13 km)
 Jeransang River (17 km)
 Beletil River (18 km)
 Besul River (10 km)
 Betong River (20 km)
 Burau River (12 km)
 Serting River (40 km)
 Bera River (60 km)
 Cerating River (52 km)
 Anak Endau River (110 km)
 Endau River (280 km)
 Kuantan River (86 km)
 Pahang River (459 km)
 Jelai River (97 km)
 Lipis River (32 km)
 Tembeling River (110 km)
 Kechau River (63 km)
Tanum River (12.5 km)
Telang River (33 km)
 Tahan River (135 km)
 Pontian River, Pahang (27 km)
 Rompin River (83 km)
 Keratong River (22 km)

Sabah

 Apas River
 Bandau River, Sabah
 Betotan River
 Binsuluk River
 Bongawan River (32 km)
 Bongaya River
 Bongon River
 Brantian River
 Bukau River
 Burong River
 Gum-Gum Besar River
 Inanam River
 Jeragan Bistari River
 Kaindangan River
 Karamuak River
 Kanibongan River
 Keguraan River
 Kimanis River (31 km)
 Klagan River
 Klias River
 Kolapis River
 Kretam Besar River
 Lakutan River
 Langkon River
 Linayukan River
 Mamahat River
 Manalunan River
 Maruap River
 Membakut River
 Mengalong River
 Mengkabong River
 Merotai River
 Milau River
 Millian River
 Moyog River
 Mumiang River
 Padas River (120 km)
 Papar River (80 km)
 Pegagau River
 Pimpin River
 Sabahan River
 Sahabat River
 Samawang River
 Sapagaya River
 Segaliud River
 Sekong Besar River
 Sengarong River
 Sepagaya River
 Sibunga Besar River
 Simandalan River
 Sinsilog River
 Suanlamba Besar River
 Sulaman River
 Tandek River
 Tanjung Labian River
 Tatulit River
 Tegupi River
 Telaga River
 Tempasuk River (21.5 km)
 Kedamaian River (52 km)
 Warlu River (33 km)
 Kawang Kawang River (21 km)
 Tiram River, Sabah
 Tuaran River (80 km)
 Ulu Tungku River
 Umas Umas River

Sarawak

 Balingian River
 Baram River
 Bayan River
 Bedengan River
 Kayan River
 Kemena River
 Kerian River, Sarawak
 Lawas River
 Likau River
 Limbang River
 Lupar River
 Maludam River
 Matu River
 Mukah River
 Niah River
 Nyalau River
 Oya River
 Pandaruan River
 Rajang River
 Balleh River
 Balui River
 Bangkit River
 Bintangor River
 Igan River
 Katibas River
 Rambungan River
 Sadong River
 Salak River
 Samarahan River
 Samusam River
 Santubong River
 Sarawak River
 Maong River
 Padungan River
 Saribas River
 Sarupai Sadupai River
 Sebuyau River
 Sematan River
 Sembakung River
 Siang Siang River
 Sibu Laut River
 Sibuti River
 Similajau River
 Sparan River
 Suai River
 Tatau River
 Telong River
 Terusan River

Terengganu

 Besut River (69 km)
Kenak River (13 km)
Pelagat River (28 km)
 Jengai River (63 km)
 Dungun River (88.4 km)
 Ibai River (18 km)
 Nerus River (105.1 km)
 Merang River (8 km)
 Keluang Besar River (19 km)
 Kemaman River (167 km)
 Kertih River  (12 km)
 Cukai River (24 km)
 Tebak River (29 km)
 Ibok River (28 km)
 Jabor River (24 km)
 Cherol River (37 km)
 Marang River (34 km)
 Mercang River (29 km)
 Paka River, Terengganu (41.6 km)
 Setiu River (126 km)
 Terengganu River (20 km)

Rivers flowing into the Strait of Malacca

Federal Territory of Kuala Lumpur

 Buloh River (11.6 km)
 Kerayong River (20 km)
 Midah River (4 km)
 Klang River (120 km:40 km WPKL)
 Gombak River (30 km)
 Langat River (78 km)

Johor

 Johor River (212 km)
 Batu Pahat River (12 km)
 Benut River (30 km)
 Kesang River (37 km)
 Muar River (250 km)
 Segamat River (23 km)
 Emas River (85 km)
 Pontian kecil River (25 km)
 Pontian Besar River (16.5 km)
 Sanglang River (22.5 km)
 Sarang Buaya River (8 km)
 Sedili Besar River (57 km)

Kedah

 Kedah River (92 km)
 Kerian River (90 km)
 Merbok River (45 km)
 Muda River (203 km)
 Pedu River (31 km)
 Tajar River (8.5 km)
 Pendang River (55 km)
 Kulim River (19.2 km)
 Tekai River (31 km)
 Padang Terap River (50 km)
 Anak Bukit River (15 km)
 Padang Kerbau River (29 km)
 Dingin River (8 km)
 Sedim River (68 km)
 Baling River (10 km)
 Ketil River (103.6 km)
 Baling River (10.7 km)
 Chepir River (27 km
 Yan Kechil River (12 km)

Malacca

 Udang River (7 km)
 Duyong River (15 km)
 Kesang River (37 km)
 Linggi River (84 km)
 Malacca River (40 km)
 Muar River (250 km)

Negeri Sembilan

 Kesang River (37 km)
 Langat River (78 km)
 Linggi River (84 km)
 Lukut Besar River (22 km)
 Malacca River (40 km)
 Muar River (250 km)
 Tampin River (11 km)
 Batang Melaka River (28.5 km)
 Gemencheh River (55.5 km)
 Gemas River (33 km)
 Sepang River (30 km)

Penang

 Juru River (19 km)
 Perai River (73 km)
 Jawi River (15 km)
 Kerian River (90 km)
 Relau River (3.2 km)
 Teluk Bahang River (2 km)
 Air Putih River (11.8 km)
 Pinang River (3.1 km)
 Air Itam River (3.8 km)
 Dondang River (6.4 km)

Perak

 Bernam River (200 km)
 Beruas River (37.3 km)
 Jarum Mas River (4 km)
 Kerian River (90 km)
 Kurau River (92 km)
 Larut River (Jaha River) (25 km)
 Manjung River (18 km)
 Perak River (427 km)
 Kinta River (100 km)
 Sangga Besar River (Sepetang River) (33 km)
 Temerloh River (14 km)
 Dinding River (15 km)
 Tiram River, Perak (3.6 km)
 Bidor River (17.9 km)

Perlis

 Besar River, Perlis (6.5 km)
 Perlis River (11.8 km)
 Korok River (17 km)
 Mati River (13.3 km)
 Abi River (13.9 km)
 Arau River (21.5 km)
 Tasoh River (9.6 km)
 Santan River (10 km)
 Panggas River (7 km)
 Jernih River (8 km)
 Pelarik River (8.5 km)
 Batu Pahat River (6 km)
 Gial River (7.8 km)
 Kechor River (7 km)
 Jarum River (10.3 km)
 Temenggung River (6.75 km)
 Kayang River (6.4 km)
 Siran River (7.5 km)
 Chuping River (5.5 km)
 Kurong Batang River (4.7 km)
 Lencong Utara (5.5 km)
 Jalan Perlis River (5.3 km)
 Mentaloon River (5.5 km)
 Chuchoh River (4.8 km)
 Repoh River (4.5 km)
 Kurong Tengar River (4 km)
 Padang River (4.2 km)
 Ngulang River (3.2 km)
 Tok Pulau River (3.7 km)
 Jejawi River (3.4 km)
 Bongor Kudong River (2.9 km)
 Seriab River (6.5 km)
 Banat River (4.4 km)

Selangor

 Bernam River (200 km)
 Buloh River (11.6 km)
 Klang River (120 km)
 Ampang River (18.3 km)
 Damansara River (21 km)
 Kemensah River (2.7 km)
 Kuyoh River (10 km)
 Penchala River (14 km)
 Langat River (78 km)
 Labu River (18 km)
 Semenyih River (37 km)
 Selangor River (110 km)
 Sepang River (30 km)
 Batu River (25.3 km)
 Tengi River (43 km)

Rivers flowing into the Sulu Sea

Sabah

 Abal River
 Bode Besar River
 Kinabatangan River (560 km)
 Labuk River (260 km)
 Liwagu River (215 km)
 Paitan River
 Segama River (350 km)
 Sibuku River
 Sugut River (178 km)

Rivers flowing into the Tebrau Strait

Johor

 Johor River (212 km)
 Segget River (4 km)
 Pulai River  (38 km)
 Skudai River (46 km)
 Tebrau River (33 km)
 Pelentong River, Johor (9 km)

External links
 Lembangan Sungai at forum.mygeoportal.gov.my 
 Senarai Lembangan Sungai Bagi Kategori Sungai-Sungai Merentas Negeri at forum.mygeoportal.gov.my 
 On-line Hydrological Data: Date: 07-01-2015 at infobanjir.water.gov.my

 
Malaysia
Rivers